The 2015 Diamond Games (known as 2015 BNP Paribas Fortis Diamond Games for sponsorship reason) was a tennis tournament played on indoor hard courts. It was the 8th edition of the Diamond Games, and part of the WTA Premier tournaments of the 2015 WTA Tour. It took place at the Sportpaleis Merksem in Antwerp, Belgium, from 9 to 15 February 2015.

Point distribution

Prize money

1Qualifiers prize money is also the Round of 32 prize money.
*per team

Singles main-draw entrants

Seeds 

1 Rankings as of February 2, 2015.

Other entrants 
The following players received wildcards into the singles main draw:
  Alison Van Uytvanck
  Yanina Wickmayer

The following players received entry from the qualifying draw:
  Kateryna Bondarenko
  Indy de Vroome
  Klaartje Liebens
  Francesca Schiavone

Withdrawals 
During the tournament
  Carla Suárez Navarro (neck injury)

Retirements
  Sílvia Soler Espinosa (right shoulder injury)

Doubles main-draw entrants

Seeds 

1 Rankings as of February 2, 2015.

Other entrants 
The following pairs received wildcards into the doubles main draw:
  Dominika Cibulková /  Kirsten Flipkens
  An-Sophie Mestach /  Alison Van Uytvanck

Withdrawals 
During the tournament
  Monica Niculescu (right thigh injury)

Finals

Singles 

  Andrea Petkovic defeated  Carla Suárez Navarro, walkover

Doubles 

  Anabel Medina Garrigues /  Arantxa Parra Santonja defeated  An-Sophie Mestach /  Alison Van Uytvanck, 6–4, 3–6, [10–5]

References

External links 
 

Diamond Games
Diamond Games
Diamond Games